is a Tokyo-based leading manufacturer, developer and distributor of medical electronic equipment, which include EEGs, EMG measuring systems, ECGs, patient monitors and clinical information systems, with subsidiaries in the U.S., Europe and Asia. The company's products are now used in more than 120 countries, and it is the largest supplier of EEG products worldwide.

In 1972, Takuo Aoyagi, a researcher at the company, invented and patented the basic principles of pulse oximetry. Two years later he developed the world's first pulse oximeter, which has  helped improve patient safety during anaesthesia.

References

External links

 Official website 

Health care companies of Japan
Manufacturing companies based in Tokyo
Companies listed on the Tokyo Stock Exchange
Electronics companies established in 1951
1951 establishments in Japan
Japanese brands